Botswana competed in the 2010 Commonwealth Games held in Delhi, India, from 3 to 14 October 2010.

Medalists

See also
 2010 Commonwealth Games

References
http://www.thecgf.com/games/tally_country.asp

Nations at the 2010 Commonwealth Games
Botswana at the Commonwealth Games
2010 in Botswana sport